Dorothy Marie Robards (born 1977) is known for the poisoning murder of her father in 1993, when she was aged 16, in Fort Worth, Texas.<ref name="sword">Guy, Fiona (18 June 2017). A Father's Death, A Daughter's Secret, 'Sword and Scale</ref>  She stole barium acetate from her high school chemistry class and laced her father's tacos with a lethal dose. The trial received media attention since she was a promising student, and patricide is a rare crime more commonly committed by men.(19 October 1994). Student charged with poisoning her dad, UPI

Mr. Robards’ death was ruled a heart attack initially. Over a year after his death, Marie confessed to a close friend. Her friend then disclosed her information to law enforcement. The medical examiner’s office used a gas chromatography–mass spectrometry machine to examine his tissue samples and detected the highly soluble metallic compound. She confessed, telling police she wished to live with her mother. She pled not guilty, explaining her intent was to make her father ill. 

Robards was convicted of murder in a 1995 trial and sentenced to 27 years in prison. She was released on parole in 2003. She is believed to now be living under a new private identity.

The crime was fictionalized in Megan Abbott's 2018 novel Give Me Your Hand, and covered in episodes of Forensic Files (Season 6, episode 5 (2001)), Redrum(Season 2, episode 17 (2014)), and Deadly Women (Season 6, episode 2 (2012)). References 

 External links 
 Poisoning Daddy, Texas Monthly'', Issue July 1996, by Skip Hollandsworth

Living people
Criminals from Texas
1977 births
Patricides
1993 murders in the United States